Horticultural Hall is a conference center in Lake Geneva, Wisconsin. Listed on the National Register of Historic Places, it was built in 1911 as a location for the professional gardeners working on nearby estates to meet and discuss their work.

In 1968, the Horticultural Hall served as the site of the first formal Gen Con, organized by Gary Gygax. Gen Con was hosted there until it was moved to the University of Wisconsin–Parkside campus in Kenosha in 1978.

The hall was listed on the National Register of Historic Places in 1999.

References

External links
Horticultural Hall website

Clubhouses on the National Register of Historic Places in Wisconsin
Buildings and structures in Walworth County, Wisconsin
National Register of Historic Places in Walworth County, Wisconsin
Lake Geneva, Wisconsin